Wayne Nelson (born June 1, 1950) is an American singer and musician best known for being the current lead singer of the rock band Little River Band, in which he also plays bass.

Shortly after his birth, Nelson's family moved to Rome, Illinois, a suburb of Peoria. During his teenage years and early twenties, he played in various regional bands around the Chicago area, emulating multiple styles but focusing on rhythm and blues.

In 1978, Nelson moved to Los Angeles, and afterward worked with artists including Kenny Loggins and Jim Messina. He toured with many performers. While in Messina's band and opening for Little River Band in 1980, LRB's management invited Nelson to join the Australian band, and he officially became a member in 1981. In addition to playing bass, he was the lead singer on LRB's hit single "The Night Owls" (1981).

Nelson's daughter Aubree died in September 1992, aged 13, in a car collision in San Diego. Their son was injured in the same collision. Nelson left LRB from 1996 to 1999 but subsequently rejoined as bass guitarist and lead singer. Since 1997 LRB has no original members.

References

External links

 Interview with Wayne Nelson on Yuzu Melodies

1950 births
Living people
Musicians from Kansas City, Missouri
American bass guitarists
American rock musicians
American rock singers
Singers from Illinois
People from the Las Vegas Valley
People from Peoria County, Illinois
Little River Band members
Guitarists from Illinois
Guitarists from Missouri
20th-century American guitarists